Pasadena High School is the first established high school in Pasadena, Texas, located along Texas State Highway 225. It serves grades 9th through 12 and is part of the Pasadena Independent School District. The principal (as of June 26, 2019) is Mrs. Laura Gomez. Pasadena High School's mascot is an eagle named "Baldy". The school colors are green and white.

Feeder pattern
Elementary schools that feed into Pasadena High School include:
Gardens
Kruse
L.F. Smith
Morales
Red Bluff
Richey
South Shaver
Pomeroy
Williams

Middle schools that feed into Pasadena High School include:

 Bobby Shaw
 DeZavala
 Keller
 Sullivan

Intermediate schools that feed into Pasadena High School include:

Jackson
Queens
San Jacinto
Southmore

Sports

Pasadena has a diverse sports programs including baseball, basketball, cross country, track, football, soccer, volleyball, golf, tennis, aquatics (swimming, diving, finswimming, open water) and softball. Football and basketball have the most storied tradition with a state finalist in football, a state championship in basketball, and state championships in track.

The facilities at Pasadena High School have gone through major renovations. All sub-varsity games are held on campus while some Varsity contests are held in Bob Barfield Gymnasium on campus named after Coach Barfield who led the Eagles to their State Finalist run in football. The district facilities shared by the other 4 high schools are Pasadena Veteran's Memorial Stadium for football and soccer, Auxiliary Stadium, basketball and volleyball share Weldon "Stoney" Phillips Field House which is named after Coach Phillips who coached the Eagles from 1951 - 1957. Baseball is played at Maguire Field which is named after Coach John "Maggie" Maguire who coached the Eagles Baseball team to the state Championship Game. Varsity contests and Softball and sub-varsity baseball games are played at the P.I.S.D. Sports Complex. The aquatics program (swimming, diving, finswimming, open water) trains and competes at Shippey Aquatic Center located at the Pasadena ISD Athletic Complex.

Football history

 District Champions		1937, 1940, 1943, 1944, 1945, 1946, 1958, 1963, 1970, 1996
 Bi-District Finalists		1937, 1940, 1943, 1944, 1945, 1946, 1958, 1963, 1970, 1994, 1995, 1996
 Bi-District Champions		1937, 1940, 1943, 1944, 1945, 1958, 1963
 Regional Finalists		1937, 1940, 1943, 1944, 1945
 Regional Champions		1945
 State Quarter Finalists		1958, 1963
 State Quarter Champions		1958
 State Semi-Finalists		1958
 State Semi-Final Champions	1958
 State Runner Up			1958

Organizations

Pasadena High School's organizations consist of The Eagle Alliance (band), The Junior ROTC (Marine Division), Orchestra, The Eagle Escort (dance team), HOSA, Choir, Theatre, photography and a slew of clubs and organizations.

Notable alumni

Bill Henry (Class of 1946), former American professional baseball player
Bert Coan (Class of 1958), former American football player
Paul Ratliff (Class of 1962), former Major League Baseball player
Robert Talton (Class of 1963), member of the Texas House of Representatives from Pasadena from 1993 to 2009.
John Eddie Williams (Class of 1972), pharmaceutical injury and mass tort attorney and founding partner of Williams Hart based in Houston.
Marlen Esparza (Class of 2007), American professional boxer

References

External links 

 Pasadena High School web site
 Eagle Football Web Page
 PHS Class of 1968 Tribute and 40 Year Reunion News
 Official PHS Class of 1968 Reunion Site
 Official PHS Class of 1968 40 Year Reunion Discussion Group
Official PHS Class of 1974 45th Class Reunion Info

Pasadena Independent School District high schools
Public education in Houston
Education in Pasadena, Texas